The first season of The Real Housewives of Melbourne, an Australian reality television series, was broadcast on Arena. It aired from 23 February 2014, until 11 May 2014, and was primarily filmed in Melbourne, Victoria. Its executive producers are Kylie Washington and Lisa Potasz.

The Real Housewives of Melbourne focuses on the lives of Jackie Gillies, Chyka Keebaugh, Gina Liano, Andrea Moss, Janet Roach, and Lydia Schiavello; It consisted of twelve episodes.

Production and crew
The Real Housewives of Melbourne was first announced by Matchbox Pictures as The Real Housewives of Australia and was set to air in 2013. On 28 July 2013 it was announced that the series had been renamed to The Real Housewives of Melbourne, along with the full cast. The six women featured on the first season were handpicked by the producers, from over one-hundred women during an eight-month process. Filming for the season began in July 2013. The official cast photo and premiere date for the series was announced on 21 January 2014.
The series at the time was the second biggest local series launch following SoHo's Wentworth.
The two-part reunion, hosted by Alex Perry, was filmed late March 2014.

The series premiere "First Impressions" was aired on 23 February 2014, while the tenth episode "Here's to Happy Endings" served as the season finale, and was aired on 27 April 2014. 
It was followed by a two-part reunion which marked the conclusion of the season and was broadcast on 4 May and 11 May 2014. 

Kylie Washington and Lisa Potasz are recognized as the series' executive producers, and Euan Jones, Virginia Hodgson, Philippa Rubira are recognized as series' producers. It is produced by Matchbox Pictures, and distributed by NBCUniversal International Television Production.

Cast and synopsis
Six housewives are featured during the first season of The Real Housewives of Melbourne, who are described as "sophisticated and affluent" women "who love to indulge in the finer things in life as well as high end drama." The six wives featured during the first season are Jackie Gillies, Chyka Keebaugh, Gina Liano, Andrea Moss, Janet Roach, and Lydia Schiavello.

Gillies is described as someone who is opinionated, spiritual and confident. The Croatian-born housewife is youngest of the housewives and has recently moved from Newcastle with her husband, Ben Gillies. Gillies had met her husband, the drummer of the Australian rock band Silverchair when she was fifteen years of age. The couple reconnected after their fourteen years of meeting and married in 2010, and since then the couple have endeavored to launch their own alcohol line, La Máscara. The pair own many properties across Australia, as well as along the coast in Croatia. Gillies is a professional psychic of which she has many clients including celebrities.

Keebaugh is a mother, businesswoman and socialite who is described as one of Melbourne's most liked and well-connected women as well as being known for being go-getter and having a positive outlook on life. Keebaugh and her husband, Bruce have been married for twenty-two years and together they have two children; a daughter named Chrissy, 19 and a son named BJ, 18. The two not only raised their kids together, they have also created and built one of the largest privately owned catering and event companies, The Big Group. With such success, the couple are now expanding their business across to more location in Melbourne. With such busy schedules the couple make sure they meet up at least once a week to connect and discuss which events they'll attend.

Liano is a divorced single mother of two teenage boys, as well her beloved poodle, Ninja, who has survived cancer. Although Liano loves fashion, she followed in her own footsteps and entered law, whereas her sisters, Teresa and Bettina Liano, are renowned fashion designers. Liano has been in law for fourteen years and now works as a criminal barrister, preferring to fight for the little guy. Liano not only knows about fashion and law, she also works as a property developer and is and a qualified art gallery curator. Away from raising her two sons and working, Liano spends her time looking for a home to live in as her apartment is currently under construction.

Moss previously worked in New York City for ABC and for Channel 7 in Sydney as a TV reporter prior to her marriage and is described to be generous as she gives at least a thousand dollars to charity on a weekly basis. Since marrying Dr. Chris Moss, one Australia's most successful plastic surgeons, the couple have gone on to have three children together. Moss has a busy schedule helping run her husband's skin center, Liberty Belle Skin Centre, managing the construction and planning of their new business as well as writing a book that is designed to help show other mothers how to get back to work.

Roach, who is described as a newly single bombshell who is fun-loving, spontaneous and a social butterfly, is a property developer who is self-made having never worked for anyone else. Recently divorced Roach, after catching her ex-husband cheating, is on a journey in a new chapter of her life. Roach is a mother of two boys, Paul, 29, and Jake, 25, as well as a step-mother of three who she remains close to. Roach is an active property developer who is currently working of  developing a massive elderly lifestyle village in Mildura, as well as renovating her Red Hill property. Away from dating and working, Roach dedicates herself to overseeing her son's treatments, as Jake was burnt in a fire two years ago and received burns to 70% of his body which he barely survived.

Schiavello is a mother of three; two boys, one girl, and step-mother of three, who is described as honest, self-assured and someone that calls it as she sees it. Schiavello has recently married well-known architect and property developer, Andrew Norbury, in Florence, Italy. In Melbourne, the pair often fly around in their private jet, especially to their holiday home in Thredbo. Schiavello is currently following her passion of interior design by studying at the Royal Melbourne Institute of Technology. Schiavello often devotes her time to her philanthropic ventures such as Murdoch Children's Research Institute, as well as spoiling her beloved dog, Figaro.

Reception
Season one of The Real Housewives of Melbourne, broke the record of the largest audience of a reality program to air on Foxtel, with a total of 542,000 viewers. It continued to average at least 428,000 viewers each episode. The season was described by Foxtel Executive Director of Television, Brian Walsh, as a game changer for Foxtel as well as obtaining blockbuster ratings, as huge social media impact, and an overall buzz surrounding the series.

U.S. ratings
The season premiered in the United States, 3 August 2014, on Bravo, the same network that initiated The Real Housewives franchise, during an afternoon time-slot. The premiere attracted an approximately 414,000 total viewers. The premiere was followed by the second episode and attracted approximately a total of 403,000 viewers. Compared the month prior the two hours of which the first and second episode aired, it saw a 39% increase in overall viewers and 42% in the younger demographic.

Awards
In 2015, Paula Zorgdrager, an editor for The Real Housewives of Melbourne, was nominated for Best Editing In Television in the fifth Australian Academy of Cinema and Television Arts Awards for the first episode, however the series was beaten by The Code.
Later in 2015, The Real Housewives of Melbourne season one, was nominated for Most Outstanding Reality Program in the 2015 ASTRA Awards, however the series was beaten by The Recruit.

Taglines
Andrea: "Never come between a woman and her plastic surgeon."
Chyka: "My fabulous life comes down to love and laughter- not luck."
Gina: "I’ll give you my opinion, but you’d better be ready to hear it."
Jackie: "My husband may be a rock star but now it’s my turn to shine, shine, shine!"
Janet: "When life throws rocks, I melt them down into diamonds."
Lydia: "I may look like a jetsetter, but my feet are firmly on the ground."

Episodes
{| class="wikitable plainrowheaders"
|+The Real Housewives of Melbourne, season 1 episodes
|- style="color:black"
! scope="col" style="background: #2D5A88; color: #ffffff;"| No. inseries
! scope="col" style="background: #2D5A88; color: #ffffff;" | No. inseason
! scope="col" style="background: #2D5A88; color: #ffffff;" | Title
! scope="col" style="background: #2D5A88; color: #ffffff;" | Original air date
! scope="col" style="background: #2D5A88; color: #ffffff;" | Overnight Australian viewers
|-

|}

Home media release
The first season was released on DVD in region 4 on 6 November 2014.

References

External links

 
 
 

The Real Housewives of Melbourne
2014 Australian television seasons